Šarec may refer to:

 Šarec (surname), Slovene surname
 , Prince Marko's horse
 Šarec (dog) (Šarplaninec), dog breed

See also 

 Šarac (disambiguation)